The HDAX is a German stock market index calculated by Deutsche Börse.  It consists of all member companies of the DAX, MDAX, and TecDAX, and is a successor to the DAX 100 index.

See also 
 DAX
 MDAX
 SDAX
 TecDAX

German stock market indices